is a 1996 fighting video game co-developed by BEC and Tose and published by Bandai for the PlayStation and Sega Saturn. Based upon Akira Toriyama's Dragon Ball franchise, following the Saiyan arc to the conclusion of the Majin Buu saga, it is the first three-dimensional fighting game in the series prior to Budokai Tenkaichi. Its gameplay consists of three-on-three fights taking place on free-roaming 3D arenas, using a main six-button configuration, featuring special moves as well as three playable modes.

Dragon Ball Z: Idainaru Dragon Ball Densetsu garnered generally positive reception from critics since its release on PlayStation and Sega Saturn, with the Saturn version being commonly regarded as the best one; Some reviewers drew comparison with Dark Edge and Psychic Force due to the freedom of movement during combat and noted its combination of strategy and fighting elements. The game was praised for its presentation, story mode, large character roster and gameplay but criticism was given towards the audio design and pixelated visuals, among other aspects between each version. Both the PlayStation and Saturn versions sold approximately 320,000 copies combined during their lifespan in Japan.

Gameplay 

Dragon Ball Z: Idainaru Dragon Ball Densetsu is a fighting game similar to Dark Edge and Psychic Force. Players fight against other characters in three-on-three matches and the fighter who manages to deplete the health bar of the opponent wins the battle. The game features three modes of play, one of which must be unlocked, a roster of 35 playable characters and their respective transformations. The story mode of the game is divided into episodes, and it encompasses all of Dragon Ball Z, featuring the most important battles of the series. The title utilizes a unique system of play that is different from most other fighters, using sprites in a free-roaming three-dimensional arena.

Although each battle begins on the ground, the majority of the action is featured skyward. The characters fly around each other and utilize rapid punches and kicks, and ki blasts, either singularly or rapidly by holding the assigned button for a short period. The characters have a limited amount of ki that can be charged over time. If the player uses all of their available ki their character will stop fighting out of exhaustion, leaving them wide open for an attack. The life meter is a scale made up of energy from both sides that shifts depending on damage taken, and after one side is depleted, the character performs a special "Meteo Attack", which takes place in a cut scene and finishes off the opponent. Each match is made up of two teams that can include one fighter or multiple fighters (up to 3) that can be switched out at various times.

Release 
Dragon Ball Z: Idainaru Dragon Ball Densetsu was first released in Japan by Bandai on 31 May 1996 for PlayStation and Sega Saturn. On 21 August 1996, an album was published exclusively in Japan by Columbia, featuring arranged songs scored by composer Kenji Yamamoto and was re-released as part of Columbia's R-Ban series on 21 October 2001. In December 1996, the Saturn version was distributed in France, Portugal and Spain as part of an agreement between Bandai, Konami and Sega. The French edition retained the original Japanese name (although is translated as Dragon Ball Z: La grande légende des boules de cristal in the title screen) but the Spanish was renamed to Dragon Ball Z: The Legend. Rumors persisted into 1997 that the Saturn version was being released in the U.S. In response Jeff Rotter, associate producer of Bandai of America, said that negotiations were underway to bring a Dragon Ball Z game to North America, but he did not say which one, and emphasized that there was not yet actual confirmation of any North American release for the franchise. Both versions were later re-released as budget titles on 20 June 1997 for the Saturn and 27 June 1997 for the PlayStation.

Reception 

Dragon Ball Z: Idainaru Dragon Ball Densetsu was met with generally positive reception from critics since its release on PlayStation and Sega Saturn, with some reviewers praising the large character roster and comparing the game with both Dark Edge and Psychic Force. The Saturn version is commonly considered as the best one. Fan reception was also positive: readers of the Japanese Sega Saturn Magazine voted to give the Saturn version a 7.1017 out of 10 score, ranking at the number 626 spot, indicating a popular following. According to Famitsu, the PlayStation and Saturn versions sold over 70,453 and 61,989 copies in their first week on the market respectively. Both the PlayStation and Saturn versions sold approximately between 297,527 and 320,000 copies combined during their lifetime in Japan.

Consoles Plus François Garnier and Maxime Roure reviewed both the PlayStation and Sega Saturn releases, praising the animated visual presentation, longevity and gameplay but heavily criticized the audio design, particularly the music not being audible due to the sound effects. Reviewing the Saturn version, Hobby Consolas Sonia Herranz regarded Dragon Ball Z: The Legend as the most curious and strangest Dragon Ball game due to its combination of strategy and fighting elements. Herranz commended the visuals for being faithful to the source material, sound design and action but felt mixed in regards to the gameplay. She also criticized the small size of sprites and "lazy" music. Jeuxvideo.coms Rroyd-Y also reviewed both the PlayStation and Saturn releases, criticizing the pixelated graphics and audio but praised the controls and story mode. Joypads Grégoire Hellot reviewed the PlayStation and Saturn versions as well, regarding it to be a "very special game and not without interest, but to be reserved for fans of the series..."

Player Ones Christophe Delpierre reviewed both the PlayStation and Sega Saturn releases, commending them for their animated audiovisual presentation and playability. Reviewing the Saturn version, Superjuegos Bruno Sol regarded it as one of the best Dragon Ball Z games alongside Super Butōden 2 and Idainaru Son Goku Densetsu, praising the freedom of movement during combat, game modes and playability but noted that the title could become repetitive and criticized the pixelated visuals. Reviewing the PlayStation version, Both Thomas and Jim of Absolute PlayStation commended the audio and character animations but criticized the graphics, technical issues and short length.

Notes

References

External links 

 Dragon Ball Z: Idainaru Dragon Ball Densetsu at GameFAQs
 Dragon Ball Z: Idainaru Dragon Ball Densetsu at Giant Bomb
 Dragon Ball Z: Idainaru Dragon Ball Densetsu at MobyGames

1996 video games
Idainaru Dragon Ball Densetsu
Sega Saturn games
PlayStation (console) games
Fighting games
Video games developed in Japan
Video games scored by Kenji Yamamoto (composer, born 1958)